SIGMET, or Significant Meteorological Information (AIM 7-1-6), is a severe weather advisory that contains meteorological information concerning the safety of all aircraft.  Compared to AIRMETs, SIGMETs cover more severe weather.

Types 

There are three main types of internationally recognized SIGMETs per ICAO:
 Volcanic ash (VA or WV SIGMET)
 Tropical Cyclone (TC SIGMET)
 Other En-route weather phenomenon (WS SIGMET), which may consist of
 Thunderstorm types
 Turbulences types
 Mountain waves
 Icing/Sleet/Hail
 Dust or sand storms
 Radioactive Cloud

This information is usually broadcast on the ATIS at ATC facilities, as well as over VOLMET stations. They are assigned an alphabetic designator from N through Y (excluding S and T). SIGMETs are issued as needed, and are valid up to four hours. SIGMETS for hurricanes and volcanic ash outside the CONUS are valid up to six hours.

Convective SIGMETs

For airmen in the U.S., there is an additional category of SIGMET known as a convective SIGMET. These are issued for convection over the coterminous U.S.. There are three types of convective SIGMETs:

There are also a few special issuance convective SIGMETs to cover extreme weather more common in the U.S., including

 Tornados
 Hail greater than or equal to 3/4 inches in diameter
 Wind gusts greater than or equal to 50 knots

Structure

SIGMETs are internationally used by ICAO and WMOs using standardized abbreviations

and are split into three lines:
 Header
 Summary
 Main Body

In sum, a standardized SIGMET will have the following structure:

TTAAii CCCC YYGGgg [BBB]
CCCC SIGMET [n][n]n VALID YYGGgg/YYGGgg CCCC-
CCCC <FIR/CTA Name> FIR <Phenomenon> OBS/FCST [AT GGggZ] <Location> <Level> [MOV XXX xx KT/KMH] [INTSF/WKN/NC] <Forecast time and forecast position>=

Header 

The header line consists of the following characters

TTAAii CCCC YYGGgg [CCx]

Summary 

The first line of the broadcast is a summary line consisting of the following characters

CCCC SIGMET [n][n]n VALID YYGGgg/YYGGgg CCCC-

{| class="wikitable"
|-
! Component !! Description
|-
| CCCC || The 4-character ICAO location of the affected area.
|-
| SIGMET || Indicates that this is a SIGMET broadcast. [a] 
|-
| [n][n]n || A sequence number of the form 1, ''01, A01, etc. which is incremented for each time the SIGMET remains effective past 0001UTC or upon renewals.  Helps indicate how long the SIGMET has been active.
|-
| VALID YYGGgg/YYGGgg || Indicates the period the SIGMET is active (WS SIGMETs can not be active for more than 4 hours), where YY is the day of the month, GG is the hour, and gg is the minute.
|-
| CCCC- || The 4-character ICAO location of the dissmenating office followed by a hyphen.
|}Notes   [a] – if it a convective SIGMET, then this will read SIG[E/C/W] CONVECTIVE SIGMET ##[E/C/W].  Where E/C/W indicates whether it's over the Eastern, Central, or Western United States, and ## indicates the number of the convective SIGMET issued for that region.

 Body 

The main body of a SIGMET can be much more variable, and consists ofCCCC [FIR/CTA list] <Phenomenon> OBS/FCST [AT GGggZ] <Location> <Level> [MOV XXX xx KT/KMH] [INTSF/WKN/NC] [FCST AT <GGgg>Z <location>]=CCCC [FIR/CTA list] is again the 4-character ICAO location, followed by the affected flight or control regions.<Phenomenon> is a code describing the meteorological phenomena as follows:

If it is a convective SIGMET, the following codes may appearOBS/FCST [AT GGggZ] indicates whether the phenomenon is observed (OBS) or forecasted (FCST), and the Zulu hour and minute that it was observed or will be forecasted.<Location> is a general description of location of the meteorological phenomenon, typically utilizing latitude and longitudinal coordinates.<Level>  helps denote the altitude that the phenomenon will be occurred, and can be expressed as[MOV XXX xx KT/KMH]  if it is a moving front, the direction and rate of movement given as a compass direction (XXX, e.g. "N" or "WNW"), and the rate is given in KT (or KMH).  Sometimes STNR (Stationary) may be used instead if no significant movement is expected.[INTSF/WKN/NC] denotes the change in strength over time.[FCST AT <GGgg>Z <location>] helps note where the front is expected to be at the end of the SIGMET's validity period.

 SIGMET Renewal and Cancellation

If when the validity period is due to expire but the phenomenon is expected to persist, a new sequence number is added to the SIGMET to renew it.

If during the validity period of a SIGMET, the SIGMET is to be cancelled, the following replaces the SIGMET messageCNL SIGMET [n][n]n YYGGgg/YYGGgg Examples 

 WSUS32 KKCI 071655
An en-route weather phenomenon in the U.S., observed by Kansas City International airport on the 7th of August, at 16:55 UTC
 SIGC
 CONVECTIVE SIGMET 83C
This is a convective weather pattern in the central region of the continguous U.S. with sequence number 83C
 VALID UNTIL 1855Z
That is valid until 18:55 UTC
 MI IN WI IL IA LM
That covers Minnesota, Indiana, Wisconsin, Illinois, Iowa, and Lower Michigan flight regions
 FROM 30E GRR-30S GIJ-30SSW BDF-10ENE IOW-50ENE DBQ-30E GRR
A description of the area of the storm, where GRR (Grand Rapids, MI airport), GIJ (Niles, MI VORTAC), BDF (Bradford, IL VORTAC), IOW (Iowa City, IA airport), and DBQ (Dubuque, IA airport) are ConTrol A'''reas (CTAs).
 AREA TS MOV FROM 25025KT. TOPS TO FL450.
Thunderstorms moving from 250 degrees (roughly WSW) at 25 knots, covering an altitude from the cloud cover to 45,000 ft.

See also 
 AIRMET
 PIREP
 IWXXM
 VOLMET

References

External links 
IWXXM 1.0 Official WMO/ICAO representation of SIGMET information in XML

Aviation meteorology
Earth sciences data formats
Weather warnings and advisories
Aviation publications